Romashki is a rural locality (a settlement) and the administrative center of Romashkovksoye Rural Settlement, Pallasovsky District, Volgograd Oblast, Russia. The population was 1,253 as of 2010. There are 11 streets.

Geography 
Romashki is located 24 km northwest of Pallasovka (the district's administrative centre) by road. Prigarino is the nearest rural locality.

References 

Rural localities in Pallasovsky District